Mossbrae Falls is a waterfall flowing into the Sacramento River, in the Shasta Cascade area in Dunsmuir, California. The falls are located just south of the lower portion of Shasta Springs. Access to the falls is via a mile-long illegal hiking trail on the Union Pacific Railroad right of way; the City of Dunsmuir is seeking to finish a safe hiking trail that will include a bridge over the river.

California Governor Arnold Schwarzenegger took President George H.W. Bush to see the falls.

Description
The bottom  is a straight plunge into the river.

Etymology
The waterfall is named for the profusion of moss on the hillside at the site, together with brae, which means "a steep bank or hillside" in Irish and Scots.

Access
The railroad line runs in a cut and in places there is little space to avoid a train; two hikers were injured by trains in 2011 and 2019. The city of Dunsmuir closed the illegal parking area in the Shasta Retreat neighborhood in 2011, and has since built most of an extension to the Hedge Creek Falls trail that when finished will cross the river on a pedestrian bridge  from the falls, but requires Union Pacific's permission to complete it.

Alternate means of access are through Mineral Spring Trail and Angel Trail in Shasta Springs, a private property owned by Saint Germain Foundation, and white water rafting from Box Canyon Dam.

Photos

References

Mount Shasta
Landforms of Siskiyou County, California
Waterfalls of California
Tourist attractions in Siskiyou County, California